Neil Goldman and Garrett Donovan are a television writing team who have worked on television comedies Family Guy, Scrubs, and Community. Another project was the television pilot Nobody's Watching, which they created and wrote with Scrubs creator Bill Lawrence. He is also co-writing Superior Donuts from 2017 to 2018.

The character on Family Guy named Neil Goldman is named after Goldman, though the real-life Neil Goldman has not written any episodes featuring his fictitious counterpart.

Credits

Family Guy
They have written Family Guy episodes "Mind Over Murder", "Da Boom", "Running Mates" and "E. Peterbus Unum".

Eventually Goldman and Donovan became story editors for the show, and later became executive story editors.

The character Neil Goldman is named after Goldman.

Scrubs
For Scrubs, the two have collaborated on "My Two Dads", "My Balancing Act", "My Hero", "My Sex Buddy", "My Interpretation", "My Screw Up", "My Cake", "My Way Home", "My Urologist", "My Best Friend's Baby's Baby and My Baby's Baby", "My Point of No Return", "My Own Worst Enemy", and "My Chief Concern". In the episode "My Boss' Free Haircut", the character of Nell Goldman is named after Goldman, and in "My ABC's", J.D. is initially going to choose two interns named Neil and Garrett to mentor.

Goldman and Donovan acted as executive producers on the show, but left after the eighth season.

Community
Goldman and Donovan served as executive producers on NBC's Community starring Joel McHale and Chevy Chase from 2009 to 2012. The pair left the show following its third season and signed a development with 20th Century FOX TV.

The characters of Fat Neil and Garrett are named after Goldman and Donovan respectively.

Superior Donuts
Goldman and Donovan, along with Bob Daily, are the developers of Superior Donuts that aired on CBS from February 2, 2017, to May 14, 2018.

References

External links
 

Year of birth missing (living people)
Living people
American television writers
American male television writers
American television producers
Screenwriting duos
Jewish American writers
21st-century American Jews
Jewish American comedy writers